The Washington Boulevard Building is a high-rise apartment building located at 234 State Street at the corner of State Street and Washington Boulevard in downtown Detroit, Michigan. The building, designed by Louis Kamper, was constructed from 1922 to 1923. It stands at 23 stories, and features a neoclassical limestone base.

Across the streets lie the Book Tower and the Book-Cadillac Hotel.

Further reading

External links
 Washington Boulevard Apartments at Emporis.com
 SkyscraperPage.com's profile on Washington Boulevard Apartments

Residential buildings on the National Register of Historic Places in Michigan
Residential skyscrapers in Detroit
Apartment buildings in Detroit
Historic district contributing properties in Michigan
National Register of Historic Places in Detroit
1923 establishments in Michigan
Louis Kamper buildings
Chicago school architecture in Michigan